Regional elections were held in Scotland on Thursday 8 May 1986, under the terms of the Local Government (Scotland) Act 1973. The previous elections had been held in 1982. The elections took place a year before the Conservative's third general election victory. Elections took place in England and Wales on the same day.

National results 

|-
!colspan=2|Parties
!Votes
!Votes %
!+/-
!Wards
!NetGain/Loss
|-
| 
|
|43.9
|
|223
|
|-
| 
|
|18.2
|
|36
|
|-
| 
|
|16.9
|
|65
|
|-
| 
|
|15.1
|
|40
|
|-
| 
|
|4.8
|
|79
|
|-
!colspan=2|Total!! !! 45.2!! ?? !!524 !!
|}

Party performance 
Labour continued to make gains, increasing their number of councillors in most of the areas contested. The Conservatives suffered heavy losses, losing control of Lothian council to Labour and Grampian and Tayside councils to no overall control. They lost all their Councillors in Dumfries and Galloway. The SNP vote failed to recover from its decline since 1980.

Results by council area

References 

 
1986
Ele
May 1986 events in the United Kingdom